Kendler is a surname. Notable people with the surname include:

Howard H. Kendler (1919–2011), American psychologist
Jenny Kendler (born 1980), American artist, activist, and naturalist
Kenneth Kendler (born 1950), American psychiatrist
Tracy Kendler (1918–2001), American psychologist